Journal of a Sad Hermaphrodite is a book written – and, some would say, compiled – by the English writer Michael de Larrabeiti and published in the United Kingdom by Aidan Ellis in 1992. It is currently out of print, but was due to be republished in quarter 4 2006/quarter 1 2007 by Tallis House.

Supposedly reproduced from a manuscript constructed by Cooper, a teacher of English Literature in a secondary school in a small Oxfordshire town, the Journal includes clippings from Cooper's commonplace book, clippings from the diary of one of Cooper's students  (who is not named) and excerpts of poetry and other well-known texts. The Journal is perhaps influenced by Cyril Connolly's The Unquiet Grave in this respect, although it modifies Connolly's use of the "commonplace book" technique – itself perhaps borrowed by Connolly from George Gissing's The Private Papers of Henry Ryecroft – to produce a more traditional narrative.

This Journal narrates the final school year of the student whose diary is included in the text, and reflects on various themes, many of which are to do with individual morality: how, and why, one makes the choices one does and lives the life one lives. The overarching theme of the text, which connects the narratives of Cooper and his student – who together make up the "Hermaphrodite" of the title, is perhaps that of writing: how to write, why to write, and what to write. This theme could be seen to be a further influence from Cyril Connolly, who considers his own failure to produce a major work of literature in his Enemies of Promise.

Texts cited in Journal of a Sad Hermaphrodite
A Portrait by Robert Louis Stevenson. Cited on page 4.
"Narcissus" from the Classical Dictionary by John Lemprière. 6-7.
Drunk as Drunk by Pablo Neruda. 8.
??? by William Golding. 8.
A Humble Remonstrance by Robert Louis Stevenson. 9.
??? by Robert Nichols. 10.

Quotes
"'And always attempt a masterpiece, then when you read one you will know how difficult they are to write'" (27).
"What are the options then? Immerse yourself in a regular job of work which will give you the illusion of solidity and safety through activity, so that you are prevented from ever having to address the real issues of your life...In this sense activity is the soul's worst enemy and should be avoided" (29).
"And where are the ones who had had talent but no bravery - those who could sing but didn't dare raise their voices. Do they suffer in the deepest part of hell?" (30).

External links
 Free PDF of the first chapter of Journal of a Sad Hermaphrodite

Novels by Michael de Larrabeiti
1992 British novels
Novels set in Oxfordshire